Emilian Grigore (born circa 1957) is a former Romanian rugby union football player. He played as hooker.

Club career
Grigore played for RCJ Farul Constanța, with which he won a Masters tournament in France alongside Romeo Bezuscu, Florea Opris, Adrian Lungu and Vasile Ion.

International career
Although being part of the Romania squad which toured Scotland in 1981, Grigore was first capped for Romania during the 1981-82 FIRA Trophy, during the match against West Germany in Bucharest, on 30 April 1982. He was also called up for the Romania team at the 1987 Rugby World Cup, playing all the three pool stage matches, with the match against Scotland being his last cap.

Honours
Farul Constanța
 Cupa României: 1986-87

References

External links

1957 births
Living people
Romanian rugby union players
Romania international rugby union players
Rugby union hookers